The common name harlequin crab may refer to:
Lissocarcinus orbicularis, an Indo-Pacific species of swimming crab (Portunidae)
Camposcia retusa, an Indo-Pacific species of spider crab (Inachidae)

Animal common name disambiguation pages